Park Jung-Suk (born April 19, 1977) is a retired football player who played for Suwon Samsung Bluewings, FC Seoul, CS Juventus București and FC Remscheid.

References

External links

1977 births
Living people
South Korean footballers
Suwon Samsung Bluewings players
FC Seoul players
ASC Daco-Getica București players
Association football defenders
K League 1 players
Liga II players
South Korean expatriate footballers
Expatriate footballers in Romania
Expatriate footballers in Germany
South Korean expatriate sportspeople in Romania
South Korean expatriate sportspeople in Germany
Footballers from Seoul